Adam Boyd (March 21, 1746 – August 15, 1835) was a United States Representative from New Jersey. He was a slaveholder.

Early life and career
Born in Mendham, he moved to Bergen County and to Hackensack a few years later. He was a member of the Bergen County board of freeholders and justices in 1773, 1784, 1791, 1794, and 1798, and was sheriff of Bergen County from 1778 to 1781 and again in 1789. Boyd was a member of the New Jersey General Assembly in 1782, 1783, 1787, 1794, and 1795, and was judge of the Court of Common Pleas of Bergen County from 1803 to 1805.

Congress
Boyd was elected as a Democratic-Republican to the Eighth Congress, serving from March 4, 1803, to March 3, 1805, and was elected to the Tenth Congress to fill the vacancy caused by the death of Ezra Darby. He was reelected to the Eleventh and Twelfth Congresses and served from March 8, 1808, to March 3, 1813. He was again judge of the court of common pleas from 1813 to 1833.

Death
Boyd died in Hackensack, and was interred there in the First Reformed Dutch Church, Hackensack.

References

External links

Adam Boyd at The Political Graveyard

1746 births
1835 deaths
Politicians from Hackensack, New Jersey
New Jersey state court judges
New Jersey sheriffs
Members of the New Jersey General Assembly
County commissioners in New Jersey
Democratic-Republican Party members of the United States House of Representatives from New Jersey
Burials at First Reformed Dutch Church, Hackensack
People of colonial New Jersey